Bandits is a 2001 American criminal comedy-drama film directed by Barry Levinson. It stars Bruce Willis, Billy Bob Thornton, and Cate Blanchett. Filming began in October 2000 and ended in February 2001. It helped Thornton earn a National Board of Review Best Actor Award for 2001. Thornton and Blanchett's performances earned praise, as each was nominated for Best Actor and Best Actress Golden Globe Awards for their performances in this film, while Blanchett was nominated for Best Supporting Actress at the Screen Actors Guild Awards. It first opened in theaters on October 12, 2001.

Plot
Two friends and convicts, Joe and Terry, break out of Oregon State Penitentiary in a concrete mixing truck and start a bank robbing spree, hoping to fund a dream they share. They become known as the "Sleepover Bandits" because of their modus operandi: they kidnap the manager of a target bank the night before a planned robbery, then spend the night with the manager's family; early the next morning, they accompany the manager to the bank to get their money. Using dim-witted would-be stunt man Harvey Pollard as their getaway driver and lookout, the three successfully pull off a series of robberies that gets them recognition on the FBI's Ten Most Wanted list, and ultimately the reward for information leading to their capture is increased to $1 million.

When Kate, a housewife with a failing marriage, decides to run away, she ends up in the hands of the criminals. Initially attracted to Joe, she also ends up in bed with Terry and a confused love triangle begins.

The three of them go on the lam and manage to pull off a few more robberies, but after a while the two begin to fight over Kate, and she decides to leave them. The two criminals then decide to pull off one last job.

The story is told in flashbacks, framed by the story of the pair's last robbery of the Alamo Bank, as told by Criminals at Large, a fictional reality television show, with which they taped an interview stating that Kate was only a hostage, not a participant. The show tells the story of their last job, which is known to be a failure when Kate tips off the police and the two are caught in the act. The two then begin to argue when Joe tells the police "You won't take us alive!" and the argument gets to the point where the two of them shoot each other dead.

At the end of the film the real story behind the last job is revealed: Harvey used some of his special effects to make it seem as though Terry and Joe were shooting each other. Dressed as paramedics, Harvey and his girlfriend Claire then run in and place the stolen money, Terry, and Joe in body bags while Kate (who was in on the plan) distracts the police by pretending to pass out in shock upon seeing the "bodies." In the ambulance, Harvey used electronics to blow out his tires which sent the ambulance into a junkyard. Under his jumpsuit, Harvey was wearing a fire suit. He lit himself on fire and rigged a bomb to go off. Harvey, Claire, Terry, and Joe flee the scene, leading officials to believe that the bodies were burned beyond recognition. Kate receives the $1 million reward for having turned them in.

Reunited, Joe, Terry, Harvey, and Kate make it to Mexico to live out their dream. The last scene shows Harvey and Claire getting married in Mexico and Kate kissing Joe and Terry passionately.

Cast

 Bruce Willis as Joe Blake
 Billy Bob Thornton as Terry Collins
 Cate Blanchett as Kate Wheeler
 Troy Garity as Harvey Pollard
 Brían F. O'Byrne as Darill Miller
 Stacey Travis as Cloe Miller
 Bobby Slayton as Darren Head
 January Jones as Claire
 Azura Skye as Cheri Woods
 Peggy Miley as Mildred Kronenberg
 William Converse-Roberts as Charles Wheeler
 Richard Riehle as Lawrence Fife
 Micole Mercurio as Sarah Fife
 Scott Burkholder as Wildwood Policeman
 Anthony Burch as Phil
 Sam Levinson as Billy Saunders
 Scout LaRue Willis as Monica Miller
 Tallulah Belle Willis as Erika Miller

Soundtrack
 "Gallows Pole" – Jimmy Page & Robert Plant
 "Tweedle Dee & Tweedle Dum" – Bob Dylan
 "Holding Out for a Hero" (written by Jim Steinman) – Bonnie Tyler
 "Twist in My Sobriety" – Tanita Tikaram
 "Rudiger" – Mark Knopfler
 "Just Another" – Pete Yorn
 "Walk On By" – Aretha Franklin
 "Superman (It's Not Easy)" – Five for Fighting
 "Crazy 'Lil Mouse" – In Bloom
 "Just the Two of Us" – Bill Withers and Grover Washington Jr.
 "Wildfire" – Michael Martin Murphey
 "Total Eclipse of the Heart" (written by Jim Steinman) – Bonnie Tyler
 "Bandits Suite" – Christopher Young
 "Beautiful Day" - U2
 "Kill The Rock" - Mindless Self Indulgence

Reception
On the review aggregator website Rotten Tomatoes, Bandits has an approval rating of 64% based on 140 reviews, with an average rating of 6.1/10. The site's critical consensus reads, "The story may not warrant its lengthy running time, but the cast of Bandits makes it an enjoyable ride." Metacritic assigned the film a weighted average score of 60 out of 100, based on 32 critics, indicating "mixed or average reviews". Audiences polled by CinemaScore gave the film an average grade of "B" on an A+ to F scale. Roger Ebert of The Chicago Sun-Times gave the movie 2 stars out of possible 4, praising the main performances but criticizing the uneven tone, writing: "It's rare for a movie to have three such likable characters and be so unlikeable itself."

In 2007 in New York, five men were prosecuted and convicted for crimes imitative of this film's plot.

Box office
In its opening weekend, the film opened at #2, behind Training Day, earning $13 million. It beat out other newcomer Corky Romano by just over four million dollars. The film grossed $67.6 million worldwide, against a budget of $75 million.

Home Video
The film was released on DVD and VHS on April 2, 2002.

References

External links
 
 Movie stills

2001 films
2000s buddy comedy films
2000s crime comedy-drama films
2000s heist films
2001 romantic comedy-drama films
American buddy comedy-drama films
American crime comedy-drama films
American heist films
American romantic comedy-drama films
2000s English-language films
Films about bank robbery
Films about friendship
Films directed by Barry Levinson
Films scored by Christopher Young
Films set in Oregon
Films set in prison
Films shot in Oregon
Films set in Portland, Oregon
Films shot in California
Films shot in Washington (state)
Films shot in Los Angeles
Films shot in San Francisco
Films shot in San Diego
Films shot in the Las Vegas Valley
Films shot in Nevada
Hyde Park Entertainment films
Metro-Goldwyn-Mayer films
Films produced by David Hoberman
2000s American films